Bronislav Snetkov (born 24 November 1967) is a Soviet speed skater. He competed in two events at the 1992 Winter Olympics.

References

External links
 

1967 births
Living people
Soviet male speed skaters
Olympic speed skaters of the Unified Team
Speed skaters at the 1992 Winter Olympics
Sportspeople from Saint Petersburg